David Morris Miner (born December 23, 1962) is a former Republican member of the North Carolina House of Representatives. who represented the state's thirty-sixth House district, including constituents in Wake County. Miner was elected to six terms in the North Carolina House of Representatives from 1992 to 2004. He was chairman of the North Carolina House Finance Committee.  Politically, Miner was an original Bush Pioneer in the 2000 campaign. Miner was elected in 1985 as National Chairman of the College Republican National Committee and served until 1987. He then joined the Jack Kemp for President campaign as a regional political director. In 1989 he founded Americans for a Balanced Budget, a citizen grassroots advocacy group. He served as chairman of the group until 2000.

In 2003, Miner founded The Resources Group, Inc., a government affairs company based in Cary, North Carolina.

References

External links
 Bailey & Dixon Solutions, LLC

|-

|-

Members of the North Carolina House of Representatives
Living people
1962 births
21st-century American politicians